A.B.C. Liniment was a patent medicine liniment sold between approximately 1880 to 1935 as a topical pain relieving agent. It was sold for relief of pain caused by various ailments, including lumbago (lower back pain), sciatica, neuralgia, rheumatism, and stiffness after exercise. It was named for its three primary ingredients, aconite, belladonna, and chloroform. There were numerous examples of poisoning from the mixture, resulting in at least one death.

References

Ointments
Patent medicines
Toxins